Randal Harold Niemann (born November 15, 1955) is an American professional baseball coach and a former pitcher who appeared in 122 Major League games, all but 10 in relief, in 1979–80 and 1982–87 for the Houston Astros, Pittsburgh Pirates, Chicago White Sox, New York Mets and Minnesota Twins. Born in Scotia, California, he attended Fortuna Union High School then College of the Redwoods.

Niemann originally signed with the New York Yankees after he was selected in the second round of the secondary phase of the 1975 Major League Baseball Draft, and his active career spanned 14 pro seasons (1975–88).  In the Major Leagues, he worked in 200 innings pitched, and allowed 219 hits and 82 bases on balls, with 102 strikeouts, three saves and three complete games. He won seven of 15 decisions (.467) and compiled a career earned run average of 4.64.

As a hitter, Niemann posted a .267 batting average (8-for-30) with 2 runs and 2 bases on balls in 33 plate appearances. Defensively, he handled 53 total chances (16 putouts, 37 assists) without an error for a perfect 1.000 fielding percentage.

Coaching career
After retiring as an active player, Niemann became a coach and instructor in the New York Mets' organization for over two decades, serving as a minor league instructor (1988–96; 2000; 2003–08; 2011) and the club's Major League bullpen coach (1997–99; 2001–02; 2009–10).

Among the managers he worked for was Bobby Valentine, and in 2012 he left the Mets' organization to serve under Valentine and pitching coach Bob McClure as the assistant pitching coach of the Boston Red Sox. On August 20, 2012, he was named Boston's head pitching coach and served through the end of the season, but was not retained by Valentine's successor, John Farrell.

In 2013, he joined the St. Louis Cardinals' organization as pitching coach of the Single-A Palm Beach Cardinals, holding that position through 2017. In , the Cardinals promoted him to minor league pitching coordinator.

References

External links

1955 births
Living people
Baseball players from California
Boston Red Sox coaches
Charleston Charlies players
Chicago White Sox players
College of the Redwoods Corsairs baseball players
Columbus Astros players
Denver Zephyrs players
Fort Lauderdale Yankees players
Hawaii Islanders players
Houston Astros players
Pittsburgh Pirates players
Major League Baseball bullpen coaches
Major League Baseball pitchers
Mayos de Navojoa players
American expatriate baseball players in Mexico
Minnesota Twins players
Minor league baseball coaches
Navegantes del Magallanes players
American expatriate baseball players in Venezuela
New York Mets coaches
New York Mets players
Oneonta Yankees players
People from Scotia, California
Portland Beavers players
St. Lucie Legends players
Tidewater Tides players
Tucson Toros players
West Haven Yankees players